Padmanabhapuram Palace, also known as Kalkulam Palace, is a Travancore era palace located in Padmanabhapuram in the Kanyakumari district of the Indian state of Tamil Nadu. The palace is owned, controlled and maintained by the government of the neighbouring state of Kerala. 
Padmanabhapuram is the former capital city of the erstwhile Hindu kingdom of Travancore. It is around 20 km from Nagercoil, 39 km from Kanyakumari  town and 52 km from Thiruvananthapuram in Kerala. The palace is complex inside with an old granite fortress around four kilometers long. The palace is located at the foot of the Veli Hills, which forms a part of the Western Ghats. The river Valli flows nearby.

Another palace known as Kuttalam Palace is situated in Kuttalam in Tenkasi district, Tamil Nadu which is also under the ownership of Kerala government. It is situated in the Tenkasi District, Tamil Nadu (before state reorganisation, Kanyakumari District, Chenkottah Taluk, Tenkasi Taluk including the areas of Kuttalam are in the control of Travancore Kingdom in Kerala). It is owned, controlled and maintained by the Kerala Government.

Construction 

The palace was constructed around 1601 CE by Iravi Varma Kulasekhara Perumal who ruled Venad between 1592 and 1609. The founder of modern Travancore, King Anizham Thirunal Marthanda Varma (1706–1758) who ruled Travancore from 1729 to 1758, rebuilt the palace in around 1750. King Marthaanda Varma dedicated the kingdom to his family deity Sree Padmanabha, a form of Lord Vishnu and ruled the kingdom as Padmanabha dasa or servant of Lord Padmanabha.  Hence the name Padmanabhapuram or City of Lord Padmanabha.  In the late 18th century, precisely in 1795 the capital of Travancore was shifted from here to Thiruvananthapuram, and the place lost its former glory. However, the palace complex continues to be one of the best examples of traditional Kerala architecture, and some portions of the sprawling complex are also the hallmark of traditional Kerala style architecture. The Palace though surrounded entirely by the State of Tamil Nadu is still part of Kerala and the land and Palace belongs to the Government of Kerala. This Palace is maintained by the Govt. of Kerala Archaeology Department.

Unique rooms 
The Padmanabhapuram Palace complex consists of several structures:
 Mantrasala; the King's Council Chamber
 Thai Kottaram, constructed before 1550
 Nataksala; the Performance Hall
 A four-storeyed mansion at the centre of the complex
 Thekee Kottaram; the Southern Palace
 Indira Vilasom, a guest house built to host guests and foreign dignitaries

Central mansion 
The four-storeyed building is located at the centre of the palace complex. The ground floor houses the royal treasury. The first floor houses the King's bedrooms. The ornamental bedstead is made of 64 types of herbal and medicinal woods, and was a gift from the Dutch merchants. Most of the rooms here and in other parts of the palace complex have built-in recesses in walls for storing weapons like swords and daggers. The second floor houses the King's resting and study rooms. Here the King used to spend time during fasting days. The top floor (called upparikka malika) served as the worship chamber of the royal household.  Its walls are covered with exquisite 18th century murals, depicting scenes from the puranas, and also few scenes from the social life of the Travancore of that time. The top floor was supposed to be Sree Padmanabha Swamy's room. This building was constructed during the reign of King Marthandavarma. He was also designated as Padmanabha Dasa and used to rule the Travancore kingdom as a servant of Sree Padmanabha Swamy.

Southern Palace 
The southern palace is as old as the 'Thai kottaram' (Mother's palace), which would make it about 400 years old. Now, it serves as a heritage museum, exhibiting antique household articles and curios. Collections of items give an insight into the social and cultural ethos of that period.

Uppirikka malika 
To the northwest of Thai Kottaram is one of the most notable parts of the royal complex, Uppirikka malika. Uppiri, which means ‘multi- storied’. Back in 1745, the then King Anizham Tirunal Marthanda Varma built this grand complex. The ground floor of this Malika housed the coveted Tranvcore royal treasury. Above this treasury was the palace king's bed chambers. Therein lies the famous sapramancha kattil. Supposedly, 64 timber samples with medicinal properties makes up this grand poster bed. A stair from the King's room leads us to his fasting Chambers. This is where the King resided when he fasted in devotion.

Other features 

The Padamnabhapuram Palace complex has several other interesting features:
 The palace is located near Thuckalay, Kanyakumari district of Tamil Nadu state but administered by the Government of Kerala state.
 The clock tower in the palace complex has a 300-year-old clock, which still keeps time.
 A big hall now bare, which can accommodate around 1000 guests, and where ceremonial feasts were held, on auspicious occasions.
 A secret passage, now blocked, through which the king, his immediate family members, and their entourage could escape to another palace, located several kilometers away in the event of any emergency. Name of this palace is Charottu Kottaram.
 A flight of steps leads to a bathing pond, which has lost its freshness due to neglect and years of disuse.
 The palace complex also has a section of curios and several interesting objects:
 An entire room filled with old Chinese jars, all gifts by Chinese merchants.
 A variety of weapons (which were actually used in warfare), including swords and daggers.
 Brass lamps, wood and stone sculpture, a variety of furniture and large mirrors made of polished metal.
 A gallery of paintings depicting incidents from the history of Travancore.
 A wooden cot made of up to 64 wooden pieces of a variety of medicinal tree trunks
 Polished stone cot, meant for cool effect
 Toilet and well

Gallery

See also
 List of State Protected Monuments in Kerala
 Tentative List of World Heritage Sites in India
 Eraniel
 Marthandavarma (novel)

References

External links

 Protected Monuments in Kerala, Archaeological Survey of India
 Padmanabhapuram Palace at the World Heritage Tentative List

Kanyakumari
Kingdom of Travancore
History of Kerala
Palaces in Tamil Nadu
Royal residences in India
Travancore royal family
Monuments of National Importance in Kerala
World Heritage Tentative List for India